The Comunn Oiseanach Oilthigh Ghlaschu ("University of Glasgow Ossian Society") was established in 1831 and is the second-oldest organization on campus. Originally a discussion group in Scottish Gaelic, it has broadened its focus to raising awareness about the Gaelic language and culture especially among students of the University of Glasgow.

Aims 
 To revive the Gaelic language on and off campus.
 For the discussion of interesting matters among members of the society. 
 To put on social events for members. 
 To encourage the study of Scottish Gaelic.

References and external links 
 An Comunn Oiseanach on Facebook
 Sgeul na Gàidhlig aig Oilthigh Ghlaschu: 19mh & 20mh linn: An Comunn Oiseanach 
 Sgeul na Gàidhlig aig Oilthigh Ghlaschu: Sreath-dheilbh: Oiseanaich 

University of Glasgow